Kevin Vincent Frandsen (born May 24, 1982) is an American sports broadcaster and former professional baseball utility player. Frandsen played in Major League Baseball (MLB) for the San Francisco Giants, Los Angeles Angels of Anaheim, Philadelphia Phillies, and Washington Nationals. He provided television color commentary for the Nationals in the 2022 season.

Playing career

College
Born in San Jose, California, Frandsen graduated from Bellarmine College Preparatory in San Jose, California, and later attended San José State University, playing for the Spartans and leaving the school as its all-time leader in hits. Frandsen is one of 28 graduates from Bellarmine to play professional baseball.  Frandsen was inducted into San Jose State's Hall of Fame in 2014.

San Francisco Giants
He was drafted by the San Francisco Giants in the 12th round (370th overall) of the 2004 Major League Baseball Draft and made his Major League debut with the Giants on April 28, 2006. Frandsen hit his first Major League home run on August 17, 2006, against the Padres at Petco Park.

On May 13, 2007, Frandsen, playing 2nd base, assisted on Omar Vizquel's MLB record setting 1,591st double play. On September 21, 2007, Frandsen became the most recent player on the San Francisco Giants to get five base hits in a single game 

In March 2008, the San Francisco Giants confirmed that Frandsen ruptured his left Achilles tendon, which forced him to miss nearly the entire season.  Frandsen was activated before the final game of the season; he had his only at-bat as a pinch hitter and made an out.

Frandsen participated in the Arizona Fall League in 2005, 2006 and 2008.

During the Giants' 2009 spring training camp Frandsen competed with Emmanuel Burriss for the starting second baseman position; Burriss was named the starter on April 1, 2009, and Frandsen was sent to the Triple-A Fresno Grizzlies. Later in the year, May 17, 2009, Frandsen was called up as Juan Uribe was placed on the bereavement list.

Boston Red Sox
Just prior to the 2010 season, Frandsen was dealt to the Boston Red Sox for a player to be named later and cash considerations.

On March 29, he was optioned to the Red Sox's Triple-A Affiliate, the Pawtucket Red Sox, along with catcher Dusty Brown. He was designated for assignment on April 28.

Los Angeles Angels of Anaheim

On April 29, 2010, Frandsen was acquired off waivers by the Los Angeles Angels of Anaheim.  He was added to the active roster, mainly playing third base to help the team deal with injuries to Maicer Izturis and Brandon Wood.

After the 2010 season, the Angels non-tendered Frandsen, making him a free agent.

San Diego Padres
On January 5, 2011, Frandsen signed a minor-league contract with the San Diego Padres.  He was released on March 25.

Philadelphia Phillies
Three days after his release from the Padres, Frandsen signed a minor league contract with the Philadelphia Phillies.  He spent the 2011 season with the Lehigh Valley IronPigs, the Phillies' Triple-A affiliate.  After spending the first four months of the 2012 season in Lehigh Valley, he was placed on the Phillies' 25-man active roster on July 27 following Plácido Polanco's move to the disabled list.  Frandsen played in 55 games, including 49 starts at third base, batting .338 with 10 doubles and 2 home runs in 195 at-bats.  After the season, he signed a one-year contract with the Phillies.

On May 26, 2013, Frandsen was ejected by umpire Mike Winters for arguing a swinging strike call. It was Frandsen's first career MLB ejection.

On June 22, 2013, Frandsen hit his first career walk-off home run, a blast off the facade of the upper deck in left field, giving the Phillies a win over the New York Mets.

On December 2, 2013, Frandsen signed one-year contract with Philadelphia that would pay him $900,000 in 2014, avoiding arbitration. He was outrighted off the roster on March 23, 2014, and elected for free agency on March 25.

Washington Nationals
After leading Major League Baseball with 14 pinch hits in 2013, Frandsen signed with the Washington Nationals on March 26, 2014.

He was released on April 1, 2015.

Arizona Diamondbacks
Frandsen signed a minor league deal with the Arizona Diamondbacks on April 21, 2015. He was released on May 30.

Return to the Giants
Frandsen signed a minor league deal for another stint with the San Francisco Giants on May 31, 2015.  On September 23, he was called up to the majors to replace Ehire Adrianza after the latter had suffered a concussion.

Post-playing career

When Frandsen did not receive an invitation to spring training in 2016, he realized his baseball career was coming to an end.  On August 8, 2016, he started co-hosting a morning sports talk radio show on KNBR 1050 called "The Audible".  On August 14, 2017, he began co-hosting "KNBR Tonight" on KNBR 680.

Frandsen coached a year of high school baseball along with his former college coach Sam Piraro at Willow Glen High School in San Jose, California. That year, he helped coach them to a CCS Championship.

In January 2018, it was announced that Frandsen would be serving as a part-time color analyst for the Philadelphia Phillies Radio Network during the 2018 season. In December 2018, it was announced that Frandsen's radio role would expand to calling half the Phillies' games per season alongside play-by-play announcer Scott Franzke.

In January 2022, the Washington Nationals announced that Frandsen would join the MASN broadcast team and provide color commentary for Nationals TV coverage.

Personal life

Frandsen, with family and friends, started and runs the "19 For Life" Foundation "...to fund off-site recreational activities for children coping with serious illness at Lucile Packard Children's Hospital; scholarships for local high school athletes who have overcome illness and adversity; and Bellarmine seniors needing financial assistance to complete their high school education."

In 2007, Frandsen completed the two courses he needed for graduation and earned a degree in finance from San José State University.

References

External links

Frannie on the Farm – Kevin Frandsen's MLBlog
San Jose State biography

1982 births
Living people
Baseball players from San Jose, California
Major League Baseball second basemen
San Francisco Giants players
Los Angeles Angels players
Philadelphia Phillies players
Washington Nationals players
San Jose State Spartans baseball players
Salem-Keizer Volcanoes players
San Jose Giants players
Norwich Navigators players
Fresno Grizzlies players
Pawtucket Red Sox players
Salt Lake Bees players
Lehigh Valley IronPigs players
Clearwater Threshers players
Reading Phillies players
Reno Aces players
Sacramento River Cats players
Major League Baseball broadcasters
Philadelphia Phillies announcers
Washington Nationals announcers
Bellarmine College Preparatory alumni